The Simon Sisters Sing The Lobster Quadrille and Other Songs for Children is the third and final studio album by the Simon Sisters, released by Columbia Records, in 1969. 

The album features musical settings of classic children's poetry.

Releases
Lobster Quadrille was released as Columbia CC 24506 with a blue label, and it was their first release for Columbia Records. The album originally came packaged with a hardcover illustrated book containing all the poems.  It was re-released without the book as Columbia CR 21525 with a red label.

The album was reissued in 1973 to capitalize on Carly Simon's success as a solo artist, under the title Lucy & Carly – The Simon Sisters Sing for Children as Columbia CR 21539. For this edition, additional instrumentation was added to the original album to give it a more pop-oriented sound.  It also has a new cover featuring a photo of the sisters.

In 2008, Shout! Factory released the album on CD, under the title Carly & Lucy Simon Sing Songs for Children. Although the disc's packaging uses the illustration from the album's original cover, the CD contains the 1973 version of the album.

Track listing
Credits adapted from the album's liner notes.

Personnel
Vocals: Lucy Simon, Carly Simon
Music composed by: Lucy Simon
Arranged and conducted by: Sam Brown
Original recording (1969) engineering: Fred Plaut, Roy Segal
Additional recording and mixing (1973): Tim Geelan, Jim Timmens
Produced for Columbia by: Arthur Shimkin
Cover photograph (1973) by: Barry Brown
Liner notes by: Mort Goode

References

External links

Carly Simon's Official Website

1969 albums
The Simon Sisters albums
Children's music albums
Columbia Records albums
Musical settings of poems by Christina Rossetti